Laab im Walde (Central Bavarian: Laab im Woid) is a town in the district of Mödling in the Austrian state of Lower Austria.

Population

References

Cities and towns in Mödling District